The Annie 30, often just called Annie, is an American sailboat that was designed by Chuck Paine as an offshore cruiser and first built in 1980.

The Annie design was later developed into the Annie 2 by Paine and offered as plans for custom building or amateur construction.

Production
The design was built by Morris Yachts in Bass Harbor, Maine, United States. The company built 16 examples of the design, starting in 1980, but it is now out of production.

Design
The Annie is a recreational keelboat, built predominantly of fiberglass, with wood trim. It has a masthead sloop rig, a spooned raked stem, a sloped transom, a transom-hung and keel-mounted rudder controlled by a tiller and a fixed long keel, with the forefoot cutaway. It displaces .

The boat is fitted with a Westerbeke two-cylinder diesel engine for docking and maneuvering.

The cabin has two design interior versions, both using teak trim. One has a forward head, just aft of the "V"-berth, while the other has an aft head, in place of the chart table and a dresser in the forward cabin. The forward cabin has a privacy curtain. The galley is located aft, on the starboard side, just ahead of the companionway stairs and has an optional two-burner stove. A shower is also optional and uses freshwater engine cooling to heat the water. Ventilation is via nine opening ports.

The genoa has tracks and the mainsheet traveler is mounted aft of the cockpit.

Operational history
In a review Richard Sherwood described the design, "Annie is a heavy-displacement boat, but she has a very tall rig and much greater sail area in the jib than older boats. In addition, freeboard is low, the bow is sharp, and the keel is quite narrow. The forefoot is cut away. With the long keel and the
heavy displacement, Annie should track well. The tall rig will assist in light air."

See also
List of sailing boat types
Annie (sloop) - a historic boat with the same name

Similar sailboats
Alberg 30
Alberg Odyssey 30
Aloha 30
Bahama 30
Bristol 29.9
C&C 30
C&C 30 Redwing
Catalina 30
Catalina 309
CS 30
Grampian 30
Hunter 30
Hunter 30T
Hunter 30-2
Hunter 306
Kirby 30
Leigh 30
Mirage 30
Mirage 30 SX
Nonsuch 30
O'Day 30
Pearson 303
S2 9.2
Seafarer 30
Southern Cross 28
Tanzer 31

References

Keelboats
1980s sailboat type designs
Sailing yachts
Sailboat type designs by Chuck Paine
Sailboat types built by Morris Yachts